Holt Hotel may refer to:

Holt Hotel (Oxfordshire) -hotel in Oxfordshire, England, said to be haunted by the notorious highwayman Claude Du Vall
Holt Hotel (Iceland) - a hotel in the Icelandic capital of Reykjavík

See also
Holte Hotel, part of the Villa Park complex, Birmingham, England